The Duleep Trophy, also known as Mastercard Duleep trophy due to sponsorship reasons, is a domestic first-class cricket competition played in India. Named after Kumar Shri Duleepsinhji of Nawanagar (also known as 'Duleep'), the competition was originally contested by teams representing geographical zones of India. Since 2016–17 it has been played by teams chosen by BCCI selectors. West Zone are the current champions.

History
The competition was started by the Board of Control for Cricket in India in the 1961–62 season. The inaugural tournament was won by West Zone who defeated South Zone in the final by 10 wickets. In the 1962–63 season four of the five teams (all except Central Zone) had their bowling attacks strengthened by a West Indies Test cricketer.

West zone is now the current highest trophy holder with 19 trophies.

Format
Until 2014–15, five Indian zonal teams regularly took part in the Duleep Trophy – North Zone, South Zone, East Zone, West Zone and Central Zone. The original format was that the five teams played each other on a knock-out basis. From the 1993–94 season, the competition converted to a league format.

For the 2002–03 season, the zonal teams were replaced by five new teams – Elite A, Elite B, Elite C, Plate A and Plate B. These teams were constructed from the new Elite Group and Plate Group divisions which had been introduced into the Ranji Trophy that season; however, this format lasted for only one season, as it was felt that the new teams lacked identity.

From the 2003–04 season until 2008, the five original zonal teams competed along with a sixth guest team which was a touring foreign team. The first guest team was England A in 2003–04. After 2008, the guest team was dropped, with the original five-team knockout tournament being used until the 2014–15 season.

The Duleep Trophy was not held in 2015-16 but returned to the calendar in 2016–17 with a new format: three teams chosen by the BCCI selectors took part, designated India Blue, India Green and India Red. The teams played a round-robin tournament, with the top two advancing to the final which was won by India Blue. The competition was held at the start of the season and all games were staged as day-night games with a pink ball used.

The Zonal format returned in 2022-23 with the original five zonal teams being joined by a new Northeast Zone team.

Composition of teams
Each zonal team is a composite team of cricketers who play for the Ranji Trophy state/city teams situated in that region of India. The teams which compose each zone are as follows:

 North Zone
 Delhi
 Haryana
 Himachal Pradesh
 Jammu & Kashmir
 Punjab
 Services
 South Zone
 Andhra Pradesh
 Goa
 Hyderabad
 Karnataka
 Kerala
 Tamil Nadu
 Central Zone
 Chhattisgarh
 Madhya Pradesh
 Railways
 Rajasthan
 Uttar Pradesh
 Vidarbha

 East Zone
 Assam
 Bengal
 Jharkhand
 Orissa
 Tripura
 Northeast Zone
 Arunachal Pradesh
 Manipur
 Meghalaya
 Mizoram
 Nagaland
 Sikkim
 West Zone
 Baroda
 Gujarat
 Maharashtra
 Mumbai
 Saurashtra

Past winners

Appearances by team

Finals appearances by team 

Note: The Wins include the shared trophies and the win percentage counts shared as half a win.

Records and statistics

Most runs

Most wickets

Broadcasters 

Star Sports is the official broadcaster of Duleep trophy. It have exclusive TV and internet streaming rights to live televise on its channels as well as Disney+ Hotstar app, from 2018 to 2023.

See also

Cricket in India
History of cricket
Ranji Trophy
Irani Cup
Deodhar Trophy
NKP Salve Challenger Trophy

References

External links
The Duleep Trophy – Cricinfo
Index to all Duleep Trophy tournaments at CricketArchive

 
Indian domestic cricket competitions
First-class cricket competitions